Magnetto is a surname. Notable people with the surname include:

Daniela Magnetto (born 1996), Italian cyclist
Héctor Magnetto (born 1944), Argentine businessman
Ugo Magnetto (born 1902), Italian footballer

Surnames of Italian origin
Italian-language surnames